Soubanh Srithirath (born 9 September 1936 – died 17 July 2012) is a Laotian politician. He served as Minister to the President's Office in Laos and was Chairman of the Lao Commission for Drug Control.

References

1936 births
2012 deaths
Members of the 7th Central Committee of the Lao People's Revolutionary Party
Members of the 8th Central Committee of the Lao People's Revolutionary Party
Lao People's Revolutionary Party politicians
Government ministers of Laos
Living people